Franklin Island is an island  long, lying in the Ross Sea about  east of Cape Hickey, Victoria Land. It was discovered on January 27, 1841 by James Clark Ross, and named for Sir John Franklin, the noted Arctic explorer, who as Governor of Van Diemen's Land (Tasmania) had royally entertained the expedition on its way south at Hobart in 1840. 
The island is the eroded remnant of a shield volcano that formed 4.8 +/- 2.0 million years ago, the vent of which is now submerged off the east coast. The island hosts a breeding colony of Adélie penguins.

Bernacchi Head forms the southern extremity of Franklin Island. The Franklin Shoals lie close by.

See also 
 Composite Antarctic Gazetteer
 List of Antarctic islands south of 60° S
 Scientific Committee on Antarctic Research
 Territorial claims in Antarctica
 List of volcanoes in Antarctica

References

Islands of Victoria Land
Volcanoes of Victoria Land
Pliocene shield volcanoes
Scott Coast